Kaylen Frederick (born 4 June 2002) is an American-German race car driver who is currently racing in the 2023 FIA Formula 3 Championship for ART Grand Prix. He was the last champion of the British Formula 3 Championship in 2020.

Career

Karting career 
Frederick began his racing career in karting at the age of seven, where he remained active until 2015.

Lower formulae 
In 2016 Frederick switched to formula racing at the age of fourteen, where he competed in the F1600 Championship Series with Team Pelfrey. Due to his age he had to miss the first six races, but was nevertheless successful with a win at the Pittsburgh International Race Complex and three second place finishes. With 474 points, he finished seventh in the championship. Later in the year the American made his U.S. F2000 debut for Pelfrey on the final race weekend at Laguna Seca, where he finished thirteenth in both races. He also drove for Pelfrey in the season finale of the F2000 Championship at Virginia International Raceway. He immediately took pole position, but finished seventh in the first race, while failing to finish the second race.

The following year Frederick competed full-time in U.S. F2000 with Pelfrey. He scored five podium finishes at Barber Motorsport Park (twice), Indianapolis Motor Speedway, Toronto Street Circuit and Mid-Ohio Sports Car Course. With 240 points he finished fourth in the standings behind Oliver Askew, Rinus VeeKay and Parker Thompson. He also drove an F2000 Championship Series weekend at Mid-Ohio, where he earned pole position and a podium finish.

In 2018, Frederick took another shot at U.S. F2000 with Pabst Racing Services. He achieved four podium finishes at Lucas Oil Raceway, Road America and Toronto to finish sixth in the final standings with 173 points, and also drove in the first race weekend of the Formula 4 United States Championship in Virginia with the K-Hill Motorsports team, but managed only a retirement, 23rd and 12th in the races. At the end of the season, the American drove for the first time in Europe for two Euroformula Open race weekends with RP Motorsport. He achieved two top ten finishes in four races, with a fifth place at the Monza as his best result. With 21 points Frederick finished fourteenth in the final standings.

BRDC British Formula 3 Championship

2019 
In 2019 Frederick drove full-time in Europe and competed in British Formula 3 with Carlin. He achieved his first class win on his first weekend at Oulton Park and added a second victory at Spa-Francorchamps. He was also on the podium at Snetterton and Silverstone, which helped him to ninth in the final standings.

2020 
The American remained in BRDC F3 for 2020. He achieved nine victories: two at Oulton Park, four at Donington Park, one at Snetterton and two at Silverstone. In the rest of the season, he took three more podiums and was crowned champion, having outscored his nearest rival Kush Maini by 51 points.

FIA Formula 3 Championship

2021 

In 2021 Frederick progressed to the FIA Formula 3 Championship. Remaining with Carlin, he was partnered by Ido Cohen and Red Bull Junior Jonny Edgar. He missed 2 rounds due to an injury and testing positive for COVID, scoring only 2 points, besting out Cohen, who scored 0 points, but got outlasted by Edgar, who scored 23 points.

2022 
He drove for Hitech Grand Prix in the post-season test and joined the team in 2022. He would finish in the top-10 for seven races, ending up 17th in the final standings.

In late September, Frederick partook in the post-season test with ART Grand Prix, driving on Day 1 and Day 2 for the French outfit.

2023 
Frederick moved to ART Grand Prix for his third Formula 3 season in 2023.

Karting record

Karting career summary

Racing record

Racing career summary

* Season still in progress.

American open-wheel racing results

U.S. F2000 Championship

Complete BRDC British Formula 3 Championship results
(key) (Races in bold indicate pole position) (Races in italics indicate fastest lap)

Complete FIA Formula 3 Championship results 
(key) (Races in bold indicate pole position; races in italics indicate points for the fastest lap of top ten finishers)

References

External links
 
 

2002 births
Living people
American racing drivers
U.S. F2000 National Championship drivers
Euroformula Open Championship drivers
FIA Formula 3 Championship drivers
People from Potomac, Maryland
Racing drivers from Maryland
RP Motorsport drivers
Carlin racing drivers
BRDC British Formula 3 Championship drivers
Team Pelfrey drivers
Hitech Grand Prix drivers
ART Grand Prix drivers
United States F4 Championship drivers